Alireza Rastegar (Persian: علیرضا راستگار, born May 17, 1978) is an Iranian inventor, author, and recipient of numerous national and international awards. He is the president of the International Federation of Inventors' Associations, a non-profit organization founded in 1968, and founder of the Silicon Valley International Invention Festival. Alireza has authored six books on innovation filed.

Early life 
Alireza Rastegar was born on May 17, 1978, in Tabriz, and grew up in Tehran city, Iran. His father, Ahad Rastegar, has worked as a chairman at Mellat Bank. Alireza is the second child and has two brothers and two sisters. He attended primary and secondary education in Tehran. Rastegar graduated from the University of Tehran in 2004 and received a master's degree in business management from the College of Alameda, California. He also holds two Doctorates of Business Administration.

Career 
Alireza started out his career as a head of Young Genius at Youth Organization, where he remained from 2000 to 2004. He was elected the executive committee member of the International Federation of Inventors' Associations in 2006. He was elected as IFIA president in November 2014 for a four-year term and re-elected in 2018 for an additional four -year term. Rastegar has also led seminars at other international innovation events in nations including Turkey, Croatia, China, Germany, Switzerland, Malaysia, Thailand, Kuwait, South Korea, Hong Kong, and India.

He is the founder of the Silicon Valley International Invention Festival(SVIIF) where he has been as chairman since 2017.

He currently serves as the board of international inventions events in many countries and helped to establish many national inventor's associations in countries like Turkey, Azerbaijan, Canada, Australia, Afghanistan, Nigeria, Sudan, Morocco, Vietnam.

He serves as the chairman of the IFIA jury board for the select winner of the WIPO Medal for Best Patent in the framework of the IAP.

Rastegar is a committee member of the World Women Inventors and Entrepreneur's Association since 2008 and has been editor of the International Journal of Scientific Research in Inventions for 4 years.

Books and publications 
 Challenging and opportunities for innovation management in today's world
 Individual and technical skills' development in the field of innovation
 Disaster Management
 What you need to know to patent
 Training Innovative Culture to Citizens
 Citizens and Creative Recycling
 A speed and accuracy comparative study of metallic collector-up InP
 Impact of using innovation on businesses during the covid-19 pandemic

Awards 
 2000-2003: Received the outstanding award at the 2nd, 3rd and 5th Khwarizmi festival in 2000, 2001 and 2003
 2003: Won the Islamic Educational, Scientific and Cultural Organization gold medal in 2003
 2004: Received a gold medal Geneva International Inventions festival.
 2006: Awarded the World Intellectual Property Organization gold medal for the outstanding inventor in 2006
 2008: Received the gold medal from Kuwait Foundation for the Advancement of Sciences
 2012: Received a genius medal at Budapest International Inventions festival

References

External links 
 Alireza Rastegar
 Alireza Rastegar's biography 
 Official website

Living people
1978 births
21st-century Iranian inventors
University of Tehran alumni